Karagedik can refer to:

 Karagedik, Baskil
 Karagedik, Gölbaşı